Higaki (written: 桧垣) is a Japanese surname. Notable people with the surname include:

, Japanese golfer
, Japanese golfer

Japanese-language surnames